Baruch Adonai L'Olam is a prayer that is recited by some Jewish communities, during Maariv on weekdays immediately preceding the Amidah. It contains a tapestry of 18 biblical verses, followed in most customs by a blessing titled Yiru Eineinu (may our eyes see).

The prayer is recited by most Ashkenazim outside of Israel.  It is recited by many Chasidim (although not by Chabad-Lubavitch). It is not recited by followers of the Vilna Gaon.  In Israel, it is largely unheard of in Ashkenazic circles (both Nusach Ashkenaz and Nusach Sefard), although it is recited by some of the minyanim associated with Machon Moreshes Ashkenaz.

It appears in old printings of Sephardic siddurim (including Venice and Livorno), although it has been largely dropped by Sephardic communities.  However, some Moroccan communities (both in Israel and elsewhere) recite the last part of the prayer (starting from Yir'u eineinu) at Maariv at the conclusion of the Sabbath.

In the Yemenite rite and the Italian rite, it is recited in and out of Israel.

The prayer was composed during post-talmudic times when synagogues could not be built in residential areas, and when Maariv was held in open fields. Its 18 verses took the place of the 18 blessings of the Amidah. The Amidah would then be recited in full privately by participants when they returned to their homes.

This prayer is not recited today in any community today on Shabbat and Yom Tov, although historically there were communities that recited it even on Shabbat.

References

Maariv
Hebrew words and phrases in Jewish prayers and blessings